Adebayo Adeleke (born July 23), better known by his stage name B-Red, is a Nigerian singer. Primarily known as Davido's cousin, his career as a solo act started in 2013 with the release of the single "Insane Girl"; the song features vocals from Davido and was produced by Shizzi. In 2016, he released his debut EP All the Way Up.

Early life 
Born in Atlanta, Georgia, United States, the son of Nigerian senator Ademola Adeleke, B-Red relocated to Nigeria to pursue a musical career. He is a cousin of the Nigerian singer Davido

Career 

In the five years he has been with HKN, B-Red has failed to put out an album, the sole project he released was an extended play EP in mid-2016. Entitled 'All The Way Up', the EP contained eight songs, including six bonus tracks, which were mostly pre-released singles.
Between 2013 and 2015, he has however released several singles which enjoyed massive airplay including "Uju" and "Cucumber" featuring Akon.
in April 2019, the HKN Singer and songwriter, B-Red dropped two songs titled "E Better" featuring Mavin Records boss, Don Jazzy. And "Achie" featuring award-winning artiste, Davido., on 12th October 2020 B-Red released another studio album titled "The Jordan" the intro featured a guest feature from his father Senitor Ademola Adeleke, B-Red also featured Nigerian legendary musician 2Baba, other guest appearances where Davido, Slimcase, Dremo, Sina Rambo, Mayorkun, Peruzzi, etc.

Discography 
EPs
All the Way Up (2016)

Albums
The Jordan (2020)

Awards and nominations

Top Naija Music Awards 

!Ref
|-
|2017
|Himself
|Artiste of the Year
|
|

References 

21st-century Nigerian male singers
Nigerian songwriters
Adeleke family